The Ice Climbing World Cup (or UIAA Ice Climbing World Tour, IWC) is an annual ice climbing competition organized by UIAA. The event is composed of a series of competitions that take place in countries around the world, culminating in a final competition.

Men Lead (Overall)

Women Lead (Overall)

Men Speed (Overall) 

* 2017: 2. Pavel Batushev doping

Women Speed (Overall)

See also 
Ice Climbing World Youth Championships

References 

Ice climbing
World cups
Annual sporting events